The 2012 Western Athletic Conference football season was the 51st and final college football season for the Western Athletic Conference in the top level of NCAA football, known since 2006 as Division I FBS. Seven teams competed in the 2012 season: Idaho, Louisiana Tech, New Mexico State, San Jose State, Texas State, Utah State, and UTSA. Utah State went undefeated against its conference opponents to become, at the time, the final WAC conference champion. It was also chosen to represent the WAC in one of its two bowl berths; conference runner-up San Jose State was chosen to fill the conference's other bowl berth.

Due to a major wave of departures that hit the WAC hard over the previous three seasons, the 2012 WAC football season marked what was at that time the conference's final season sponsoring football. Before the season began, San Jose State and Utah State announced they would be leaving to join several other former WAC schools in the Mountain West Conference. Louisiana Tech and UTSA joined several other schools in moving to Conference USA after the season, which also contains several former WAC members. Texas State moved to the Sun Belt Conference. Idaho and New Mexico State joined Notre Dame, Army, Navy, and BYU as FBS independents for 2013 before becoming Sun Belt football-only members in 2014 (Idaho left the WAC entirely as part of the realignment; while electing to keep their football team as a Bowl Subdivision member, the Vandals returned to the Big Sky Conference for other sports).

The WAC will reinstate football in the fall 2021 season, but at the second level of NCAA football, Division I FCS. For more information on the revival of WAC football, see the section of the main conference page that discusses this development.

Previous season

Rankings

Regular season

Week One

Week Two

Bowl games

Home attendance

Louisiana Tech's home game against Texas A&M was played at the 49,427-seat Independence Stadium in Shreveport.

References